WYP may refer to:

The West Yorkshire Playhouse, a theatre in Leeds, UK
West Yorkshire Police, a police force in the UK
World Year of Physics 2005, a commemoration of physics